Adrian Neniță (born 2 November 1996) is a Romanian footballer. He made his Liga I debut against Politehnica Iași on 30 May 2013.

Honours

Club
Viitorul Constanța
Liga I: 2016–17

References

External links
 Player profile on Liga1.ro

Sportspeople from Vaslui
1989 births
Living people
Romanian footballers
FC Vaslui players
FC Viitorul Constanța players
AFC Chindia Târgoviște players
Liga I players
Liga II players
Association football midfielders